Khodr Alama, sometimes written as Khodr Alameh or Khodr Alame (Arabic: خضر علامة) (born December 3, 1963) is a Lebanese music executive and entrepreneur. He is the founder and current CEO of Backstage Production. He is the brother and manager of Lebanese singer Ragheb Alama.

Life and career
Alama is a graduate of York University, where he was a Business major. He began a career in the music industry as a guitarist and manager for his brother Ragheb Alama, who had won the Platinum Medal on the Lebanese TV show Studio El Fan in 1980. 

Khodr was the first to bring music videos to the Middle East with Ragheb Alama's song "Albi A'she'aha". After disputes with record labels at the time of releasing Ragheb's album "Al Hob El Kebeer", Khodr established his own artist management and entertainment company Backstage Production to manage the works of his brother.

Backstage Production
Alama founded Backstage Production in 1999 and secured deals with Samsung, Mercedes Benz, Persol, the Malaysian Ministry of Tourism, and the Lou Loua Project in Qatar.  Ragheb achieved a Platinum Certification from Virgin Megastores in Dubai for the album "Ba'sha'ak". Ragheb also features on a song with Colombian singer Shakira which was featured on the Backstage-produced album "Starz Vol. 1" which was sold at Starbucks Coffee shops. Khodr also signed international artists such as DJ Karma.

References

External links
'' Backstage Production official website

Living people
1963 births
Lebanese musicians
York University alumni